A Perfect Fit is a 2021 Indonesian film directed by Hadrah Daeng Ratu, written by Garin Nugroho and starring Nadya Arina, Refal Hady and Giorgino Abraham.

Cast

Release
It was released on July 15, 2021, on Netflix streaming.

Reception
Common Sense Media gave it 3 out of 5 stars.

References

External links 
 
 

2021 films
Indonesian romantic comedy films
2020s Indonesian-language films
Indonesian-language Netflix original films